Jochberg may refer to

 Jochberg, Tyrol, a municipality in Austria
 Jochberg (mountain) in Bavaria, Germany